The Daiichi Fudosan Cup was a professional golf tournament that was held in Japan from 1988 to 1992. It was an event on the Japan Golf Tour from 1990 and was the first official event of the season with prize money of ¥90,000,000. It was replaced on the tour schedule in 1993 by the Token Homemate Cup.

Tournament hosts

Winners

References

External links
Coverage on the Japan Golf Tour's official site

Former Japan Golf Tour events
Defunct golf tournaments in Japan
Sport in Miyazaki Prefecture
Recurring sporting events established in 1988
Recurring sporting events disestablished in 1992
1988 establishments in Japan
1992 disestablishments in Japan